Enterprise liability is a legal doctrine under which individual entities (for example, otherwise legally unrelated corporations or people) can be held jointly liable for some action on the basis of being part of a shared enterprise. Enterprise liability is a form of secondary liability.

United States
Suppose high-risk manufacturing activities are shunted into one corporation, while a second "marketing" corporation keeps all the profits.  In the case that someone was injured by the manufacturing activity, a court might apply the enterprise liability doctrine to allow recovery from the marketing corporation, which holds all the assets.

The doctrine emerged from litigation in the wake of the 1977 Beverly Hills Supper Club fire. The doctrine is examined in Walkovsky v. Carlton, 223 N.E.2d 6 (N.Y. 1966).

Enterprise Liability has been used as alternative terminology for Industry-Wide Liability.

Sindell v. Abbott Laboratories, 607 P.2d 924 (Cal. 1980) cites Hall v. E.I Du Pont De Nemours & Co., Inc., 345 F.Supp. 353 (E.D.N.Y. 1972) to explain Industry-Wide Liability, which was equated to Enterprise Liability:

The concept of Enterprise Liability is distinguished from Market share liability, a legal doctrine introduced in Sindell v. Abbott Laboratories.

United Kingdom

The idea of enterprise liability was supported by the Court of Appeal in DHN Food Distributors Ltd v Tower Hamlets London Borough Council, a case on piercing the corporate veil.

More generally in the law of tort, the principle has been argued to have been recognised, albeit indirectly, by cases such as Lister v Hesley Hall Ltd. A general principle of joint liability in tort between different contractors that work in a supply chain was also recognised in Viasystems Ltd v Thermal Transfer Ltd.

See also
UK company law
US corporate law

Notes

References
AA Berle, 'The Theory of Enterprise Entity' (1947) 47(3) Columbia Law Review 343

Public liability
Legal doctrines and principles